The 2012 Ipswich Council election took place on 3 May 2012 to elect members of Ipswich Council in England. This was on the same day as other 2012 United Kingdom local elections.  Ipswich Borough Council has 48 councillors who are elected for a term of four years. The councillors are elected in 'thirds' with one councillor in each of the 16 wards retiring each year for three out of four years.
Every fourth year there is a break from the borough council elections and elections for county councillors are held instead.
Ipswich Borough Council is also responsible for the administration of UK Parliamentary general elections, formerly European Parliamentary elections and national and local referendums.

Results

Alexandra

Bixley

Bridge

Castle Hill

Gainsborough

Gipping

Holywells

Priory Heath

Rushmere Ward

References

2012 English local elections
2012
2010s in Suffolk